The S21 is a regional railway service of the Zürich S-Bahn of the Zürcher Verkehrsverbund (ZVV).

Route 
 

The service operates on weekdays during peak hours; there are a total of eight trains in each direction per day. Inbound trains in the morning and outbound trains in the evening bypass . Trains stop at the following stations:

History 
The current S21 began running with the December 2015 timetable change.

Rolling stock 
 most services are operated by Re 450 class locomotives pushing or pulling double-deck passenger carriages.

References

External links 

 

Zürich S-Bahn lines
Transport in the canton of Zürich